The Baldy Northcott Trophy or Manitoba Provincial Junior B Hockey Championship is a Canadian ice hockey series to determine the Manitoba representative at the Keystone Cup - the Western Canada Junior "B" hockey championship.

History
First awarded by Hockey Manitoba in 1940, the Baldy Northcott Trophy is named after the former professional player Baldy Northcott. He coached the Winnipeg Rangers for one season capturing the 1941 Memorial Cup. Northcott is a member of the Manitoba Hockey Hall of Fame. The trophy is given to the winners of the Junior B championship in Manitoba, Canada.

Several Junior B leagues have participated in the provincial championship over the years. NorMan Junior Hockey League champion Flin Flon Bombers defeated Manitoba Junior B Hockey League winner Trainscona Railers in four games in the 1978 series.

Eastman Junior B Hockey League champion Mitchell Mohawks represented their league in 1986 losing to the North Winnipeg Satelites in two-straight games. From 1999 to 2004 the trophy was contested between the MJBHL and Northwest Junior Hockey League.

Since 2005, the champion of the Keystone Junior Hockey League has stood uncontested as Provincial titlist as the NJHL dissolved in 2004.

Champions

Note: Most Baldy Norcott Finals were a best-of three series. The 2003 and 2004 tournaments were a one-game final.

* = MJBHL Carillon Cup Finals winner was awarded the Baldy Norcott Trophy.

See also
Hockey Manitoba
Keystone Junior Hockey League
Northwest Junior Hockey League

References

External links
Hockey Manitoba
Keystone Junior Hockey League

Hockey Manitoba
Ice hockey in Manitoba
Ice hockey tournaments in Canada